Coakley Bay Estate is a  property in the East End area, east of Christiansted, Saint Croix, U.S. Virgin Islands.  It was listed on the National Register of Historic Places in 1976.  The listing included seven contributing sites.

The property includes surviving stonework of a mill for grinding sugarcane and of a -tall windmill for drawing water.  A capstone on the latter is marked "1810".  It includes a one-story  great house with foundation and main floor built of "red ballast and yellow brick".  Wood frame interior work appears to date from about 1920.

References

External links
Visit The Virgin Islands

Sugar plantations in Saint Croix, U.S. Virgin Islands
Plantations in the Danish West Indies
Saint Croix, U.S. Virgin Islands
Buildings and structures completed in 1810
Historic districts on the National Register of Historic Places in the United States Virgin Islands
Buildings and structures on the National Register of Historic Places in the United States Virgin Islands
1810 establishments in North America
1810s establishments in the Caribbean
1810s establishments in Denmark
19th century in the Danish West Indies